The 1981–82 Virginia Cavaliers men's basketball team represented University of Virginia and was a member of the Atlantic Coast Conference.

Virginia was the top seed in the Mideast region of the 48-team NCAA tournament, but was upset by two points in the Sweet Sixteen by the UAB Blazers, before a partisan crowd in

Roster

Schedule

|-
!colspan=9 style="background:#00214e; color:#f56d22;"| Regular season

|-
!colspan=9 style="background:#00214e; color:#f56d22;"| ACC Tournament

|-
!colspan=9 style="background:#00214e; color:#f56d22;"| NCAA Tournament

Awards and honors
 Ralph Sampson, Adolph Rupp Trophy
 Ralph Sampson, Naismith College Player of the Year
 Ralph Sampson, USBWA College Player of the Year
 Ralph Sampson, John R. Wooden Award

NBA draft

References

Virginia Cavaliers men's basketball seasons
Virginia
Virginia
Virgin
Virgin